Sir John Trevor (c. 1637 – 20 May 1717) was a Welsh lawyer and politician. He was Speaker of the English House of Commons from 1685 to 1687 (the Loyal Parliament) and from 1689 to 1695. Trevor also served as Master of the Rolls from 1685 to 1689 and from 1693 to 1717. His second term as Speaker came to an end when he was expelled from the House of Commons for accepting a substantial bribe. He is the second most recent speaker to be forced out of office, with Michael Martin being the most recent.

Early life
John Trevor was born around 1637 or 1638, the exact date of his birth being unrecorded. His father, also called John Trevor, was the son of Sir Edward Trevor; his mother was Margaret Jeffreys, daughter of John Jeffreys and aunt of the celebrated judge. The family lived at Brynkinalt in the parish of Chirk in the Welsh county of Denbighshire.

Trevor was educated at Ruthin School, and he started his career as a clerk for his relative Arthur Trevor. From there he worked his way up with the help of the patronage of another relative  George Jeffreys until he was appointed a king's counsel by Charles II.

Political and judicial appointments

In 1685 he was appointed to the high offices of Master of the Rolls and Speaker of the House of Commons by James II. Being a Tory and a partisan of James II, the accession of William III saw Trevor deprived of his office. In 1690, however, he once again returned to parliament as Speaker. From 1693, he also once again held the judicial office of Master of the Rolls. Between 1692 and 1695, he represented Newry in the Irish House of Commons.

As Speaker, he was memorable for being severely cross-eyed—the affliction was so confusing to members of the House that they were frequently uncertain as to which of them had "caught the Speaker's eye", and would try to speak out of turn.

Scandal
He was accused of taking bribes from the East India Company and the City of London, and was investigated by a committee chaired by the Commissioner of Accounts, Paul Foley MP. On 7 March 1695, he was found guilty of accepting a bribe of 1,000 guineas from the City of London Corporation to aid the passage of a bill through the house. This was judged to be a "high crime and misdemeanour" and he was expelled from the House of Commons on 16 March 1695, a move which he initially resisted on the ground of ill-health. He was not asked to refund the bribe and retained his judicial position until his death at the age of 79 or 80 on 20 May 1717.

Family

Trevor married Jane Mostyn, the daughter of Sir Roger Mostyn. They are known to have had four children: Edward, Arthur, John and Anne. Trevor's wife predeceased him, dying in August 1704.

Notes

References

 (article of family member)

Speakers of the House of Commons of England
Masters of the Rolls
Tory MPs (pre-1834)
Irish MPs 1692–1693
Irish MPs 1695–1699
Members of the Parliament of England (pre-1707) for constituencies in Wales
Members of the Parliament of Ireland (pre-1801) for County Armagh constituencies
Politicians from Denbighshire
17th-century Welsh judges
1630s births
1717 deaths
Year of birth uncertain
Place of death unknown
Members of the Privy Council of Ireland
17th-century English judges
Members of the Parliament of England for Bere Alston
English MPs 1661–1679
English MPs 1679
English MPs 1680–1681
English MPs 1681
English MPs 1685–1687
English MPs 1689–1690
English MPs 1690–1695
18th-century English judges